Quetzalcoatlus  is a genus of pterosaur known from the Late Cretaceous period of North America (Maastrichtian stage); its members were among the largest known flying animals of all time. Quetzalcoatlus is a member of the Azhdarchidae, a family of advanced toothless pterosaurs with unusually long, stiffened necks. Its name comes from the Aztec feathered serpent god Quetzalcoatl. The type species is Q. northropi, named by Douglas Lawson in 1975; the genus also includes the smaller species Q. lawsoni, which was known for many years as an unnamed species before being named by Brian Andres and Wann Langston Jr. (posthumously) in 2021.

Discovery and species
 
The first Quetzalcoatlus fossils were discovered in Texas, United States, from the Maastrichtian Javelina Formation at Big Bend National Park (dated to around 68 million years ago) in 1971 by Douglas A. Lawson, then a geology graduate student from the Jackson School of Geosciences at the University of Texas at Austin.

Lawson in 1975 announced the find in an article in Science. That same year, in a subsequent letter to the same journal, he made the original large specimen, TMM 41450-3, the holotype of a new genus and species, Quetzalcoatlus northropi. The genus name refers to the Aztec feathered serpent god, Quetzalcoatl. The specific name honors John Knudsen Northrop, the founder of Northrop, who drove the development of large tailless flying wing aircraft designs resembling Quetzalcoatlus.

At first it was assumed that the smaller specimens were juvenile or subadult forms of the larger type. Later, when more remains were found, it was realized they could have been a separate species. This possible second species from Texas was provisionally referred to as a Quetzalcoatlus sp. by Alexander Kellner and Langston in 1996, indicating that its status was too uncertain to give it a full new species name. This species was named Q. lawsoni in 2021, named after the genus' original describer.

The holotype specimen of Q. northropi had not been properly described and diagnosed until 2021 and until then the status of the genus Quetzalcoatlus was identified as problematic. Mark Witton and colleagues (2010) noted that the type species of the genus—the fragmentary wing bones comprising Q. northropi—represent elements which are typically considered undiagnostic to generic or specific level, and that this complicates interpretations of azhdarchid taxonomy. For instance, Witton et al. (2010) suggested that the Q. northropi type material is of generalized enough morphology to be near identical to that of other giant azhdarchids, such as the overlapping elements of the contemporary Romanian giant azhdarchid Hatzegopteryx. This being the case, and assuming Q. northropi can be distinguished from other pterosaurs (i.e., if it is not a nomen dubium), perhaps Hatzegopteryx should be regarded as a European occurrence of Quetzalcoatlus. However, Witton et al. also noted that the skull material of Hatzegopteryx and Q. lawsoni differ enough that they cannot be regarded as the same animal, but that the significance of this cannot be ascertained given uncertainty over the relationships of Quetzalcoatlus specimens. These issues can only be resolved by Q. northropi being demonstrated as a valid taxon and its relationships with Q. lawsoni being investigated. An additional complication to these discussions is the likelihood that huge pterosaurs such as Q. northropi could have made long, transcontinental flights, suggesting that locations as disparate as North America and Europe could have shared giant azhdarchid species. Q. lawsoni was found to be a valid taxon in 2021, and confirmed to belong to the same genus as Q. northropi. 

An azhdarchid neck vertebra, discovered in 2002 from the Maastrichtian age Hell Creek Formation, may also belong to Quetzalcoatlus. The specimen (BMR P2002.2) was recovered accidentally when it was included in a field jacket prepared to transport part of a Tyrannosaurus specimen. Despite this association with the remains of a large carnivorous dinosaur, the vertebra shows no evidence that it was chewed on by the dinosaur.

Description

Size

Choosing the middle of three extrapolations from the proportions of other pterosaurs gave an estimate of 11 m, 15.5 m, and 21 m, respectively (36 ft, 50.85 ft, 68.9 ft).

Body mass estimates for giant azhdarchids are extremely problematic because no existing species share a similar size or body plan, and in consequence, published results vary widely.

Skull
Skull material from Q. lawsoni shows that Quetzalcoatlus had a very sharp and pointed beak. That is contrary to some earlier reconstructions that showed a blunter snout, based on the inadvertent inclusion of jaw material from another pterosaur species; this material was named as the holotype of a genus of short-snouted azhdarchid, Wellnhopterus, in 2021. A skull crest was also present but its exact form and size are still unknown.

Classification

Below is a cladogram showing the phylogenetic placement of Quetzalcoatlus within Neoazhdarchia from Andres and Myers (2013).

Paleobiology
Quetzalcoatlus was abundant in Texas during the Lancian in a fauna dominated by Alamosaurus. The Alamosaurus-Quetzalcoatlus association probably represents semi-arid inland plains. Quetzalcoatlus had precursors in North America and its apparent rise to widespreadness may represent the expansion of its preferred habitat rather than an immigration event, as some experts have suggested. It co-existed with another azhdarchid known as Wellnhopterus, as well as an additional pterosaur taxon, suggesting a relatively high diversity of Late Cretaceous pterosaur genera.

Feeding

There have been a number of different ideas proposed about the lifestyle of Quetzalcoatlus. Because the area of the fossil site was  removed from the coastline and there were no indications of large rivers or deep lakes nearby at the end of the Cretaceous, Lawson in 1975 rejected a fish-eating lifestyle, instead suggesting that Quetzalcoatlus scavenged like the marabou stork (which will scavenge, but is more of a terrestrial predator of small animals), but then on the carcasses of titanosaur sauropods such as Alamosaurus. Lawson had found the remains of the giant pterosaur while searching for the bones of this dinosaur, which formed an important part of its ecosystem.

In 1996, Lehman and Langston rejected the scavenging hypothesis, pointing out that the lower jaw bent so strongly downwards that even when it closed completely a gap of over  remained between it and the upper jaw, very different from the hooked beaks of specialized scavenging birds. They suggested that with its long neck vertebrae and long toothless jaws Quetzalcoatlus fed like modern-day skimmers, catching fish during flight while cleaving the waves with its beak. While this skim-feeding view became widely accepted, it was not subjected to scientific research until 2007 when a study showed that for such large pterosaurs it was not a viable method because the energy costs would be too high due to excessive drag. In 2008 pterosaur workers Mark Witton and Darren Naish published an examination of possible feeding habits and ecology of azhdarchids. Witton and Naish noted that most azhdarchid remains are found in inland deposits far from seas or other large bodies of water required for skimming. Additionally, the beak, jaw, and neck anatomy are unlike those of any known skimming animal. Rather, they concluded that azhdarchids were more likely terrestrial stalkers, similar to modern storks, and probably hunted small vertebrates on land or in small streams. Though Quetzalcoatlus, like other pterosaurs, was a quadruped when on the ground, Quetzalcoatlus and other azhdarchids have fore and hind limb proportions more similar to modern running ungulate mammals than to their smaller cousins, implying that they were uniquely suited to a terrestrial lifestyle.

Flight

The nature of flight in Quetzalcoatlus and other giant azhdarchids was poorly understood until serious biomechanical studies were conducted in the 21st century. One early (1984) experiment by Paul MacCready used practical aerodynamics to test the flight of Quetzalcoatlus. MacCready constructed a model flying machine or ornithopter with a simple computer functioning as an autopilot. The method of flight in these pterosaurs depends largely on weight, which has been controversial, and widely differing masses have been favored by different scientists. Some researchers have suggested that these animals employed slow, soaring flight, while others have concluded that their flight was fast and dynamic. In 2010, Donald Henderson argued that the mass of Q. northropi had been underestimated, even the highest estimates, and that it was too massive to have achieved powered flight. Henderson argued that it may have been flightless.

Other flight capability estimates have disagreed with Henderson's research, suggesting instead an animal superbly adapted to long-range, extended flight. In 2010, Mike Habib, a professor of biomechanics at Chatham University, and Mark Witton, a British paleontologist, undertook further investigation into the claims of flightlessness in large pterosaurs. Henderson's work was also further criticized by Witton and Habib in another study, which pointed out that although Henderson used excellent mass estimations, they were based on outdated pterosaur models, which caused Henderson's mass estimations to be more than double what Habib used in his estimations, and that anatomical study of Q. northropi and other big pterosaur forelimbs showed a higher degree of robustness than would be expected if they were purely quadrupedal. This study proposed that large pterosaurs most likely utilized a short burst of powered flight to then transition to thermal soaring. However, a study from 2022 suggests that they would only have flown occasionally and for short distances, like the Kori bustard (the world's heaviest bird that actively flies) and that they were not able to soar at all.

Studies of Q. northropi and Q. lawsoni published in 2021 by Kevin Padian and colleagues instead suggested that Quetzalcoatlus was actually a powerful flier with a large breastbone to support the necessary muscles for creating the flight stroke and would probably have used its powerful hind legs to launch as high as  when taking off, allowing it to gain enough height and momentum to begin the necessary downstrokes needed for takeoff. This same study also suggests that Quetzalcoatlus had limited walking motion in its wings, with the limbs on each side of the body being moved together and the forelimbs being lifted out of the way of the hindlimbs. This study also suggests that the wings of pterosaurs were only attached to the body, with the legs and feet being tucked underneath, much like how modern birds tuck their legs beneath their own bodies in flight.

Cultural significance

In 1975, artist Giovanni Casselli depicted Quetzalcoatlus as a small-headed scavenger with an extremely long neck in the book The evolution and ecology of the Dinosaurs by British paleontologist Beverly Halstead. Over the next twenty-five years prior to future discoveries, it would launch similar depictions colloquially known as a "paleomeme" in various books as noted by Darren Naish.

In 1985, the US Defense Advanced Research Projects Agency (DARPA) and AeroVironment used Quetzalcoatlus northropi as the basis for an experimental ornithopter unmanned aerial vehicle (UAV). Coincidentally, Douglas A. Lawson, who discovered Q. northropi in Texas in 1971, named it after John "Jack" Northrop, a developer of tailless flying wing aircraft in the 1940s. The replica of Q. northropi incorporates a "flight control system/autopilot which processes pilot commands and sensor inputs, implements several feedback loops, and delivers command signals to its various servo-actuators". It is on exhibit at the National Air and Space Museum.

In 2010, several life-sized models of Q. northropi were put on display on London's South Bank as the centerpiece exhibit for the Royal Society's 350th-anniversary exhibition. The models were created by scientists from the University of Portsmouth.

See also
 List of pterosaur genera
 Timeline of pterosaur research

References

External links 

 Quetzalcoatlus at EarthArchives.org
 
 
 
 

Azhdarchids
Late Cretaceous pterosaurs of North America
Ojo Alamo Formation
Maastrichtian genus extinctions
Taxa named by Douglas A. Lawson
Fossil taxa described in 1975
Quetzalcoatl